Álvaro Tierno Román (born 30 October 1992) is a Spanish footballer who plays for SD Tarazona as a midfielder.

Football career
Born in Zaragoza, Tierno graduated from local Real Zaragoza's youth setup, and made his senior debuts with the farm team, CD Universidad de Zaragoza. In July 2012 he joined CD Sariñena of the Tercera División.

Tierno returned to the Aragonese side in the 2013 summer, being assigned to the reserves also of the fourth level. On 17 May 2014 he played his first match as a professional, starting and playing the full 90 minutes of a 2–2 home draw against CE Sabadell FC in the Segunda División.

References

External links

1992 births
Living people
Footballers from Zaragoza
Spanish footballers
Association football midfielders
Segunda División players
Segunda División B players
Tercera División players
CD Universidad de Zaragoza players
Real Zaragoza B players
Real Zaragoza players
CD Ebro players
SD Tarazona footballers